Matthew Chapman or Matt Chapman may refer to:

Matthew Chapman (author) (born 1950), author, screenwriter, director, journalist and great-great-grandson of Charles Darwin
Matthew Chapman (born 1976), one half of The Brothers Chaps who created the Homestar Runner animated cartoons 
Matt Chapman, editor of MyM magazine
Matt Chapman (born 1993), American professional baseball player
Mat Chapman (1865–1909), English cricketer
Matt Chapman (darts player) (born 1981), English darts player